In the Catholic Church, Servant of God is the style used for a person who has been posthumously declared "heroic in virtue" during the investigation and process leading to canonisation as a saint.

The term is used in the first of the four steps in the canonization process. The next step is being declared Venerable, upon a decree of heroism or martyrdom by the honored. That is followed by beatification, with the title of Blessed. After the confirmation of miracles resulting from the intercession of the honored, the final step is canonization, where the honored would receive the title of Saint.

List
The following is an incomplete list of people currently declared to be a Servant of God. The list is in alphabetical order by Christian name but, if necessary, by surname or the place or attribute part of the name.

References

See also 

 List of saints
 List of beatified people
 List of venerated Catholics
 Servants of God by nationality

Servants